The Big Breakfast was an Australian children's breakfast television series presented by Tim Bailey that aired on Network Ten from 21 December 1992 until 5 July 1995. The series aired every weekday from 7:00am to 8:30am and later from 6:30am to 8:30am (same timeslots as several over Australian children's breakfast television series such as Cheez TV and Agro's Cartoon Connection) and featured competitions, music videos and cartoons such as X-Men, Biker Mice from Mars, The Ren and Stimpy Show, Dungeons and Dragons, Bobby's World, The Incredible Hulk, Speed Racer, Eek! The Cat, The Transformers, The Adventures of Teddy Ruxpin, Mighty Mouse and Friends, Bionic Six, Casper and Friends, The Adventures of T-Rex, Alvin and the Chipmunks (Ruby Spears version), Fievel's American Tails, Piggsburg Pigs!, Back to the Future, Garfield and Friends, Transformers: Generation 2, Exo-Squad, Conan the Adventurer, Peter Pan and the Pirates, Little Wizards, Bucky O'Hare and the Toad Wars!, Capitol Critters and Adventures of Sonic the Hedgehog and a few live-action shows such as the American sitcoms Bewitched and I Dream of Jeannie, the very first The Lone Ranger TV series and the American children's super hero series Superhuman Samurai Syber-Squad as well as the Australian children's wildlife series Totally Wild in which Bailey also presented.

The show ended on 5 July 1995 and was then replaced by Cheez TV another Australian children's morning series that also showed cartoons.

References

Network 10 original programming
Australian children's television series
Television shows set in Sydney
English-language television shows
1992 Australian television series debuts
1995 Australian television series endings
Breakfast television in Australia
Australian music television series
Australian preschool education television series